The Lemhi River is a  river in Idaho in the United States. It is a tributary of the Salmon River, which in turn is tributary to the Snake River and Columbia River.

Course
From its source near Leadore and the confluence of several headwater streams, the Lemhi River flows generally northwest, through the Lemhi Valley, between the Lemhi Range to the west, and the Bitterroot Range and Beaverhead Mountains to the east. The Lemhi River flows into the Salmon River at the city of Salmon.

River modification
The water of the Lemhi River and its tributaries is used for irrigation agriculture. Of the river's mainstem tributaries, only 7% are not totally disconnected year round due to diversion for irrigation.

History
In August 1805 Lewis and Clark crossed the continental divide at the Lemhi Pass  to the east of the Lemhi River. There, the group encountered a tribe of Shoshone Indians, one of whom turned out to be Cameahwait, brother of Sacagawea.  The expedition sent a reconnaissance party, guided by Swooping Eagle, north along the Lemhi to the Salmon River attempting to find a navigable path, but turned back when they found that the Salmon was not passable by boat or on land.

See also
 Lemhi (disambiguation)
 List of rivers in Idaho
 List of longest streams of Idaho

References

External links

Rivers of Idaho
Rivers of Lemhi County, Idaho
Tributaries of the Salmon River (Idaho)